Vendenheim is a commune in the Bas-Rhin department, Alsace, administrative region of Grand Est, northeastern France. It has been the eastern terminus of the LGV Est high-speed rail from Paris to Strasbourg since 2016.

Population

See also
 Communes of the Bas-Rhin department

References

Communes of Bas-Rhin
Bas-Rhin communes articles needing translation from French Wikipedia